Tengger Desert Solar Park is the sixth-largest photovoltaic plant in the world as of December, 2021. It is located in Zhongwei, Ningxia, China. It covers an area of 43 km2. In 2018, it was the solar park with the largest peak power capacity (1,547 MW).

See also
 List of photovoltaic power stations 
 List of power stations in China
 Solar power in China

References

Photovoltaic power stations in China